Timoteo Aparicio was a Uruguayan politician and military figure that was a member of the National Party who was most notable for spearheading the Revolution of the Lances.

Biography
He spent a good part of his life in the Florida Department and from there he defended the causes of the National Party, throughout the national territory. The Battle of Paso Severino was one of the most important events in his life as a revolutionary.

Their first confrontations took place with Manuel Oribe, in 1836 and later in the Great Siege of Montevideo, when the Great War and the Government of Cerrito .

During the Presidency of Bernardo Prudencio Berro, he faced the forces of General Venancio Flores on several occasions. After the triumph of Flores in 1865, the white caudillo emigrated to Entre Ríos Province, Argentina. He returned in 1870, crossing the Uruguay River at the height of Gualeguaychú , to start the Revolution of the Lances, named after the weapon that he'd prefer using. In Paso Severino, between the current towns of Mendoza Chico and 25 de Mayo and on September 12 of that year, he faced forces loyal to President Lorenzo Batlle, who was defeated and successfully overthrown. The Convention of April 6, 1872 put an end to this armed struggle and lead to cooperation between the Colorados and Nationals.

In January 1875, when the constitutional President José Eugenio Ellauri was overthrown, the National Party, headed by General Timoteo Aparicio, offered to restore it but was rejected.

The continuous armed struggles in which he participated forced him to abandon his job, in addition to having mortgaged his house and lands in favor of the revolutionary cause. In times of peace he was a very appreciated and supportive neighbor, dedicating himself to working the land with his own hands to survive; He ended his days in the midst of poverty, and after a painful ailment.

He was a respected man admired by co-religionists and also by his adversaries and proof of this was that a government of the Colorado Party which he opposed and conferred the rank of General on him.

In 2010, Aparicio's remains were moved from La Paz to the pantheon of the unknown soldier in the city of Florida.

References

1814 births
1882 deaths
Uruguayan National Army generals
National Party (Uruguay) politicians